Halima Ferhat (born 1941) is a Moroccan historian, specialist in the Middle Ages of the Maghreb and professor at the Mohammed V University. She was also Director of the Institute of African Studies in Rabat.

Works

Books
 Sabta des origines. au XIVème siècle, ed. Rabat : Ministère des Affaires Culturelles, 1993, 
 Le soufisme et les zaouias au Maghreb, Casablanca, Ed. Toubkal (2003)
 (with A. Sebti) Al Mujtama' Al Hadari wa al Sulta bi al Maghrib (texts on urban society and power in Morocco, 15th-18th century), 2007
 Le Maghreb aux XIIème et XIIIème siècles: Les siècles de la foi, Wallada,

Articles
  Abu l-'Abbas: contestation et sainteté, in: Al-qantara: Revista de estudios árabes, ISSN 0211-3589, Vol. 13, Fasc. 1, 1992, pags. 185-204
 Un monument almoravide: la grande-mosquée de Ceuta/Sabta (approche textuelle), in: Anaquel de estudios árabes, ISSN 1130-3964, Nº 4, 1993, pags. 77-86
  As-Sirr al-Masun de Tahir as-Sadafi: un intinéraire au XIIe siècle, Al-qantara: Revista de estudios árabes, ISSN 0211-3589, Vol. 16, Fasc. 2, 1995, pags. 273-290
Le Culte du Prophète au Maroc au XIIIe siècle : organisation du pèlerinage et célébration du Mawlid / Halima Ferhat . In La Religion civique à l'époque médiévale et moderne, chrétienté et islam : actes, Rome : Éd. de l'École française de Rome, 1995
 Souverains, saints et fuqaha': le pouvoir en question, in: Al-qantara: Revista de estudios árabes, ISSN 0211-3589, Vol. 17, Fasc. 2, 1996, pags. 375-390
 Les Relations entre le Maghreb et l'Orient au Moyen Âge : pèlerinage, initiation et découverte de l'autre. In: Quaderni mediterranei. - N. 9 (1996)
Frugalité soufie et banquets de "zaouyas": l'éclariage des sources hagiographiques, in: Medievales: Langue, textes, histoire, ISSN 0751-2708, Nº 33, 1997 (Ejemplar dedicado a: Cultures et nourritures de l'occident musulman), pags. 69-80
 Le saint et son corps: une lutte constante, in: Al-qantara: Revista de estudios árabes, ISSN 0211-3589, Vol. 21, Fasc. 2, 2000, pags. 457-470

Co-authored
 Assises du pouvoir. Temps médiévaux, territoires africains, Presses Universitaires de Vincennes, 1994, 
 Cultures et nourritures de l'Occident musulman, n° 33, Essais dédiés à Bernard Rosenberger, Presses Universitaires de Vincennes, février 1998, n° 33, 
 Les pèlerinages de Sakir et de Massa, in: Lieux sacrés, lieux de culte, sanctuaires : approches terminologiques, méthodologiques, historiques et monographiques, 2000, p. 171-178
 (ed. with Halima Ferhat), Pratiques et stratégies identitaires au Sahara, Rabat, Publications de l'Institut des Études Africaines, 2001
 Savoir et négoce à Ceuta aux XIIe et XIIIe siècle, in: Ceuta en el Medievo : la ciudad en el universo árabe, 2002, p. 145-174

Miscellaneous
 Melanges Halima Ferhat, Rabat, Université Mohammed V, 2005
 Marinid Fez: Zenith and Signs of Decline

References
 Her story making history.com, bibliographic information by the administrator of that site, Halima Ferhat

External links
Interview (in French) 
The Almoravid mosque of Sebta (PDF file, in French): 

Moroccan writers in French
20th-century Moroccan historians
Academic staff of Mohammed V University
Living people
Writers from Rabat
1941 births